Hartford station may refer to:

 Union Station (Hartford), the major station in Hartford, Connecticut, United States
 Hartford railway station, in the village of Hartford, Cheshire, England

See also 
 Hertford North railway station, in Hertford, England
 Hertford East railway station, in Hertford, England